Jeux sans frontières was a Europe-wide television game show. The 1999 edition was won by Bolzano, Italy. To date, this is the last edition of the gameshow.

Participating countries and cities

Heat 1
Broadcast Date : Monday 5 July 1999
Venue: Castello Aragonese, Le Castella

Heat 2
Broadcast Date : Monday 12 July 1999
Venue: Castello Aragonese, Le Castella

Heat 3
Broadcast Date : Monday 19 July 1999
Venue: Castello Aragonese, Le Castella

Heat 4
Broadcast Date : Monday 26 July 1999
Venue: Castello Aragonese, Le Castella

Heat 5
Broadcast Date : Monday 2 August 1999
Venue: Castello Aragonese, Le Castella

Heat 6

Broadcast Date : Monday 9 August 1999
Venue: Castello Aragonese, Le Castella

Heat 7
Broadcast Date : Monday 16 August 1999
Venue: Castello Aragonese, Le Castella

International Final
Broadcast Date : Monday 23 August 1999
Venue: Castello Aragonese, Le Castella,

the teams which qualified from each country to the final were:

Final table

Jeux sans frontières
1999 television seasons
Television game shows with incorrect disambiguation